The 1st Joe Fry Memorial Trophy was a non-championship Formula Two motor race held at Castle Combe Circuit on 4 October 1952. The race was won by Roy Salvadori in a Ferrari 500, setting fastest lap in the process. Ken Wharton in a Frazer Nash FN48-Bristol was second and Ninian Sanderson third in a Cooper T20-Bristol. Stirling Moss started from pole in an ERA G-Type but retired just after halfway distance.

Results

References

Joe Fry Memorial Trophy
Joe Fry Memorial Trophy
Joe Fry Memorial Trophy